F.P.1 is a 1932 German film directed by Karl Hartl. The film was based on the 1931 novel of the same name by Kurt Siodmak. The plot concerned a permanent air station in the middle of the Atlantic Ocean. 
The film was developed as a multilingual version, with one film each in German, French, and English. The film was shot in 1932 and premiered in Berlin late that year with English and French-language versions premiering the next year.

Plot 
Lieutenant Droste wants to build an air station in the middle of the ocean to allow pilots on intercontinental flights to refuel and repair any damage to their aircraft. With the help of the pilot Ellissen, he manages to win the support of the Lennartz-Werke for the project. Ellissen, who has taken up with the owner's sister Claire Lennartz, shies away from marriage and seeks new adventure.

After two years, the platform has become a city on the ocean, with runways, hangars, hotels, and shopping centers. During a storm, the connection to the platform is severed. The last sounds to come over the telephone were gunshots and screams. The weather clears and the best pilots immediately head for F.P.1. Ellissen, in a lovesick depression, is convinced by Claire to accompany her to the platform. Their plane crashes on the island but they survive.

The crew of F.P.1 has been the victim of a saboteur, who knocked them out with gas. Before chief engineer Damsky fled in a boat, he opened the valves, causing a danger that F.P.1 will sink. Claire finds the badly injured Droste and takes care of him. Ellissen has to recognize that Claire is slipping away from him. After a short time, he pulls himself together and takes a plane out to get help. He sees a ship, jumps from his plane, is taken aboard the ship, and calls for help via radio. A fleet of ships and planes are sent to rescue F.P.1.

Cast

Production
F.P.1. was based on the 1933 novel by F.P.1 antwortet nicht. The film was shot in Berlin. Other parts of the set were filmed on platforms designed by Erik Kettlehut on the Baltic Sea island of Greifswalder Oie. The film was shot between August 15, 1932, and December 15, 1932.

Three versions of the film were made for international audiences: a German version titled F.P.1 antwortet nicht, a French version titled Î.F.1 ne répond plus and an English-language version titled F.P.1.

Release
The German version of the film was released was shown on December 22, 1932, in Berlin at the Ufa-Palast am Zoo. The French-language version was shown in Paris on February 24, 1933.

The English-language version debuted in London in 1933 where it was released by Gaumont-British running at 74 minutes, over half an hour less than the German version. When Fox released the film in the United States it ran for 90 minutes.  The English version was shown in the United Kingdom on April 3, 1933, and in New York on September 15, 1933.

Reception
Reviewing the German-language version, Variety declared the film to be "UFA's greatest picture of this year" and found it to be "a success with regard to speed, continuity and cast of the leading femme role" and that photography and sound were "first class". Reviewing the French version, Variety called Charles Boyer "excellent" and said the film had an "Ordinary enough story but redeemed by wonderful photography and the thrills provided by trick machinery."

Reviewing the English-language version, Variety proclaimed it "well made with good photography and lighting, sound that is well recorded and generally good direction and acting. Picture falls short of best result partly because of the English accents of the players", and concluded that "It's a good English product but not yet competition with Hollywood on the finer points." Film Daily highly praised the film, stating that the production "have outdone anything of its kind that Hollywood has ever conceived", specifically praising the built floating island, and calling the plot "a powerful romance intertwined into a very realistic story, with a great series of climaxes" with "Superior photography".   The Motion Picture Herald noted the "imaginative setting" and that set were "marvelously contrived [...] There is no lack of thrills in the serial shots and sequences showing the incursion of water and the desertion of the crew." Harrison's Reports declared it "a fairly good melodrama" with "ingenious and clever background" while noting that "the first half is slow, but the second half holds one in tense suspense."

Legacy
Following F.P.1, Hans Albers and director Karl Hartl teamed up for Gold and The Man Who Was Sherlock Holmes (1936).

By 1933, a political joke referring to Adolf Hitler played on the title of the film: "P.G.1 antwortet nicht." (meaning "Parteigenosse 1 antwortet nicht," or "Party Member 1 doesn't answer.").

See also 

 List of films made in Weimar Germany
 Project Habakkuk
 Pykrete

References

Sources

External links 
  
  
  
 Photographs and literature

1932 science fiction novels
1932 films
1930s science fiction films
German science fiction films
Films of the Weimar Republic
1930s German-language films
1930s French-language films
1930s English-language films
Films directed by Karl Hartl
Films with screenplays by Curt Siodmak
German multilingual films
German black-and-white films
Films based on German novels
Films based on science fiction novels
German aviation films
Films set in Hamburg
1932 multilingual films
1930s German films